Alice Helen Anne Boyle (1869 – November 1957) was an Irish-British physician and psychologist. She was Brighton's first female general practitioner, and the first female president of the Royal Medico-Psychological Association (now the Royal College of Psychiatrists). Boyle had a passion for helping women with mental illness in poverty and used this to begin an era of proper treatment for mental disorders.

Early life and education
Helen Boyle was born in Dublin, Ireland, in 1869, and studied in France and Germany, before moving to England in 1887. She studied at the London School of Medicine for Women from 1890 to 1893, under Elizabeth Garrett Anderson. In 1893, she qualified through the Scottish triple examination which allowed Scottish medical schools to equalise with other schools globally. 

Boyle became licensed in the Royal College of Physicians of Edinburgh and the Royal Faculty of Physicians and Surgeons of Glasgow and completed a Doctor of Medicine (MD) degree in Brussels in 1894.

Career
From 1894 to 1897, Boyle worked as an assistant medical officer at Claybury Hospital, where she focused on neurological disorders, as well as the Canning Town Mission Hospital. During her time in the East End of London, she was shocked by the way patients had to deal with emotional stress. While there, she became the first psychiatrist to identify bacillary dysentery among mental health patients in the facility. Boyle later became the medical superintendent at Canning Town Mission Hospital in the East End of London. As a result of the first hand experience she gained in working with mentally ill women in poverty, she was inspired to start her own facility.

In 1897, she moved to Hove, East Sussex, where she and Mabel Jones set up the Lewes Road Dispensary for Women and Children, a GP surgery in Roundhill Crescent. In doing so, Boyle became the first female general practitioner in Brighton and Hove.

Jones mostly looked over Lewes Road Dispensary which allowed Boyle to move to Brighton to start another hospital. In 1905, Boyle set up the Lady Chichester Hospital in Brighton for women suffering with mental diseases. The hospital offered free or low cost care in a mostly women environment. This practice was made specifically for the treatment of early mental disorders which was the first facility ever created for that type of treatment. The practice later relocated to Hove, and was founded to counter the problem of mentally ill women being sent to asylums. The facility was the only one in Brighton to provide inpatient care. One of Boyle's patients in 1922 was the outsider artist Madge Gill, who she seems to have supported in her ambitions to display her works.

Boyle worked at this facility for fifty years and remained an integral part of the practice through location changes and expansions. In 1910, she was the only woman to speak during a discussion organised by Farquhar Buzzard about anxiety, depression and cyclothymia. During the First World War, from 1914 to 1918, she worked in Serbia with the Royal Free Hospital Unit along with James Berry, and after the war, she was awarded the Queen Elisabeth Medal and the Order of St.Sava.

Boyle joined the Royal Medico-Psychological Association (now the Royal College of Psychiatrists) in 1898. After being an active and integral member of the association for years, Boyle became its first female president. In 1955 the association held their spring meeting in Brighton, to commemorate 50 years of the Lady Chichester Hospital. She was also involved in the creation of the Guardianship Society (1913), the Medical Women's Federation (1917), the International Medical Women's Federation (1922), The Child Guidance Council, and the National Association for Mental Health (now known as Mind).

Death and legacy
In 1929, Boyle moved to Pyecombe, West Sussex and she died there in November 1957, one day after her 88th birthday.[3][5] She was pioneer in mental health care for women. 

In 2015, a blue plaque at Aldrington House was erected for her, and a Brighton & Hove bus has been named in her honour.

Awards and honours
 Queen Elisabeth Medal
 Order of St.Sava

References

External links
 

1869 births
1957 deaths
19th-century British medical doctors
20th-century British medical doctors
Medical doctors from Dublin (city)
People from Hove
British women medical doctors
British general practitioners
British women psychiatrists
Recipients of the Order of St. Sava
20th-century women physicians
19th-century women physicians
People from Mid Sussex District